Fae Ellington, CD, OD, is a Jamaican media personality and lecturer best known for hosting the television series Morning Time on JBC for more than twelve years.

Background
Fae Audrey Ellington was born on 28 May 1950 in the district of Smithville in Clarendon Parish, Jamaica. She was the only child of Mary "Mae" Williams, and Exford Joseph Ellington, a school teacher. Her parents never married and Fae would not meet her father until she was 21 years old. In addition to growing up with the stigma of being a child of unwed parents, Ellington also had asthma and dyslexia.

Career
In 1974, Ellington joined the Jamaica Broadcasting Corporation (JBC), eventually hosting Morning Time for over a dozen years. She also served as one of the main news anchors on Jamaican radio and television for decades.

In 2005, she made her directorial debut, when she staged the one-woman show Who Will Sing for Lena.

She currently hosts the programme Profile on Television Jamaica, replacing the previous host Ian Boyne after his death.

Awards and recognition
2015 – Order of Distinction, Commander Class
2005 – Best Director nomination, Actor Boy Awards for Who Will Sing for Lena
1998 – Order of Distinction, Officer Class
1992 – Distinguished Past Student of St. Hugh's High School, Kingston, Jamaica

References

1953 births
Jamaican actresses
People from Clarendon Parish, Jamaica
Jamaican journalists
Jamaican women journalists
Recipients of the Musgrave Medal
Officers of the Order of Distinction
Living people
Television presenters with dyslexia